The Alapayevsk narrow-gauge railway is a Russian narrow-gauge railway with a track gauge of . The Head Office of the narrow-gauge railway is located in Alapayevsk, Sverdlovsk Oblast.

History 
The first section of the railway (Alapayevsk–Mugay) commenced operations in July 1898. Construction was undertaken by French businessman A.Illero.

Current status 

At present only  of the railway is operational. Current operations include passenger traffic and general goods movement. The railway operates a scheduled passenger service from Alapaevsk. The railway is the primary means of communication for seven rural settlements in the Alapaevsk District: Elnichnaya; Garaninka; Strokinka; Berezovka; Muratkovo; Sankin and Kalach. Principal cargoes include wood, food, postal services and fuel.

Rolling stock

Locomotives 
TU4 – № 1800, 1637, 1332, 1828, 1452, 2881, 1452
TU7 – № 2386, 2388, 2083, 1915, 1659, 3367
TU6A – № 2526, 2896
TU8 – № 0010
PD-1 railcar
SMD railcar
TD-5U "Pioneer" – Transportation local residents

Railroad car
Boxcar
Flatcar
Tank car
Snowplow
Hopper car
Open wagon
Passenger car (rail)

Gallery

See also
Narrow-gauge railways in Russia

References and sources

External links

 Alapayevsk narrow-gauge railway on Sergey Bolashenko's railway site 
 Photo – project «Steam Engine» 
 The book – «Alapaevsk narrow-gauge railway» 

750 mm gauge railways in Russia
Railway lines opened in 1898
Rail transport in Sverdlovsk Oblast
Logging railways in Russia